Reticulidia is a genus of sea slugs, dorid nudibranchs, shell-less marine gastropod molluscs in the family Phyllidiidae.

Species
Species in the genus Reticulidia include:

 Reticulidia fungia  Brunckhorst & Gosliner in Brunckhorst, 1993
 Reticulidia gofasi   Valdés & Ortea, 1996 
 Reticulidia halgerda  Brunckhorst & Burn, 1990
 Reticulidia suzanneae  Valdes & Behrens, 2002

References

Phyllidiidae
Gastropod genera